"Tea for Three" is an episode of the BBC sitcom, Only Fools and Horses. It was the fourth episode of series 5, and was first broadcast on 21 September 1986. In the episode, Del and Rodney find themselves battling for the affections of Trigger's niece Lisa.

Synopsis
It is Talent Night at The Nag's Head, and Albert is stressed because his wife Ada is in hospital, even though the two have been estranged. Trigger tells Del Boy and Rodney that his niece Lisa will be arriving shortly. Del and Rodney both remember her from their childhood. When Lisa, now aged 25, arrives, Del and Rodney are immediately shocked to discover that the scruffy girl they once knew has evolved into a pretty young woman. Besotted, they both invite her over to Nelson Mandela House for dinner the following day. In the meantime, Albert gets up on the stage and sings the song "Hey There" (though he pronounces it as "Ada") in tribute to his ailing wife Ada, and wins the talent contest.

The next day, Albert is trying out the new solarium to cure his hangover, and Del enters the flat with a bag of food for the date with Lisa. Rodney says that he also made a contribution: cheese, because it is all he can afford. As the Trotter Brothers start to argue, Albert tells them both to stop it, and decides to go down to the Legion. As Rodney lies under the solarium, Albert talks about the time that he and Grandad fell out over the affection of Ada and never spoke to each other again. But Rodney falls asleep. Albert leaves, and Del turns up the timer on the solarium before leaving too.

Later that night, Del and Lisa are enjoying each other's company, while Rodney is in pain due to his sunburnt face. Lisa tells the Trotter Brothers that she has some friends who run a hang gliding club, in which Del lies by saying he enjoys the activity. This gives Rodney an idea in order to exact revenge for having his face burned. Rodney tells Lisa privately that they should give Del a chance to hang glide as a surprise for his "46th" birthday.

The following morning in Winchester, Del is surprised to hear that he is going to hang glide. He and Rodney meet the owner of the hang gliding club, Andy. Del also knows that Rodney did this just to torment his older brother. Rodney, with a "change of heart", decides to help Del out with the following plan: Del will pretend to be keen to hang glide, and he will put all the gear on. Just when Del is about to take off, Rodney will come up to him and say that they've got a very important telephone call from London, and have to go back. Del agrees to this plan. But just as Del does everything on his part, Rodney betrays his older brother at the last second and refuses to go along with the escape plan. Del, not wanting to disappoint Lisa, actually flies the hang glider – right out to sea.

Twelve hours later, Del is still missing. Back at the flat, a regretful Rodney is studying a map when Trigger and Mike show up with Del in a wheelchair, who apologises to Rodney for tampering with the solarium controls. Rodney, on the other hand, thinks that Del is pretending to be injured just to gain sympathy (thanks to Trigger unwittingly revealing they came back via a Green Line bus rather than an ambulance), and is proven right when Del leaps out of his wheelchair and attempts to attack Rodney. Del then tells the story about how he flew all the way to Redhill, only to crash into a television transmitter and fall on top of an unsuspecting courting couple in their Ford Sierra, and how he has to pay for a new sunroof due to damage to the car, and on how the couple will have to postpone their upcoming wedding because of injuries sustained by Del and his glider landing on them, alongside a situation in Dymchurch where a group of children mistook Del for a spaceman and also may have to pay Radio Rentals for the damage to the transmitter. The mention of the husband and wife to be who Del injured, in turn reminds Trigger to tell the others of Lisa's wedding to Andy, who she has actually been engaged to for over a year, has been set. Mike offers to open the Nag's Head early for a celebration drink, and Trigger and Albert join him, while Del and Rodney both realise their efforts towards Lisa were all for nothing.

Episode cast

Music
Joan Baxter: "I Who Have Nothing"Buster Merryfield: "Hey There"

In some VHS/DVD releases, the part where Uncle Albert sings Hey There was cut out.

External links

1986 British television episodes
Hampshire in fiction
Hang gliding
Only Fools and Horses (series 5) episodes
Winchester